Sir Fiatau Penitala Teo  (23 July 1911, in Funafuti – 25 November 1998) was a political figure from the Pacific nation of Tuvalu. Teo was appointed Chief in the House of Chiefs of Niutao in 1945 and was reappointed as a Chief on 29 June 1997 after his service as the first Governor General of Tuvalu. 

Teo was appointed as an Ordinary Member of the Civil Division of the Most Excellent Order of the British Empire (MBE) in 1956; awarded the Imperial Service Order (I.S.O.); and appointed as an Ordinary Member of the First Class, or Knight Grand Cross of the Most Distinguished Order of Saint Michael and Saint George (GCMG) in 1979.

Background
When plans for Tuvalu, the former Ellice Islands colony, to become independent of the United Kingdom, the people of Tuvalu decided to retain Queen Elizabeth II as their head of state, and the post of Governor-General was established in 1978.

Governor-General of Tuvalu
In 1978, Teo was appointed as the first Governor-General of Tuvalu by Elizabeth II, Queen of Tuvalu. He served from 1 October 1978 to 1 March 1986. As Governor-General, he oversaw the first change in Tuvalu's post-Independence government in 1981.

After stepping down as Governor-General in 1986, Teo was succeeded in that office by Sir Tupua Leupena.

Death
Sir Fiatau Penitala Teo died on Funafuti in 1998.

Family
Teo was married to Uimai (Tofiga) Teo.

His son Samuelu Teo represented Niutao in the parliament from 1998 to 2006.  Samuelu Teo was again elected to represent Niutao in the 2015 Tuvaluan general election. Following the 2019 Tuvaluan general election, on 19 September 2019, the members of parliament elected Kausea Natano from Funafuti as prime minister; and Teo was elected as Speaker of the Parliament of Tuvalu.

His son Feleti Penitala Teo (b. 9 Oct. 1962) was attorney general of Tuvalu (1991-2000); and acting secretary-general of the Pacific Islands Forum (2008).

See also
 Politics of Tuvalu

References

1911 births
1998 deaths
Tuvaluan politicians
Governors-General of Tuvalu
People from Niutao
Knights Grand Cross of the Order of St Michael and St George
Companions of the Imperial Service Order
Members of the Order of the British Empire